City Railway Colony  is a neighbourhood in Saddar Town in Karachi, Pakistan and is part of the administrative district Karachi South.

The colony is comprising the entire area south of the Karachi City Station and the I. I. Chundrigar Road between the Railway Street with the MagnifiScience Centre is in the west and the Jinnah Courts and PIDC Bridge on the east. The KPT container terminal and the Moulvi Tamizuddin Khan Road builds the southern border.    

There are several ethnic groups including Muhajirs, Sindhis, Punjabis, Kashmiris, Seraikis, Pakhtuns, Balochis, Memons, Bohras Ismailis.

Main areas 
 Bottle Ghali
 New Challi
 Pakistan Chowk
 Serai Quarters
 Gate No.10
 N.T.R. colony 
 Gharibabad

References

External links 
 Website Karachi Metropolitan Corporation

Neighbourhoods of Karachi
Saddar Town